Al-Sayyid (also spelled al-Sayed) is a village in central Syria, administratively part of the Homs Governorate, located east of Homs in the Syrian Desert. Nearby localities include Fatim al-Arnouk to the immediate northeast, Tell Shinan to the northwest and Furqlus to the southeast. According to the Central Bureau of Statistics (CBS), al-Sayyid had a population of 1,309 in the 2004 census.

References

Populated places in Homs District